Mackay Courthouse is located at 12 Brisbane Street, Mackay in Queensland, Australia.

The complex contains the current and former courthouses as well as police residences and other police buildings.

History
The courthouse was constructed during the Great Depression as part of a government initiated works scheme to alleviate unemployment. It was completed in 1939.

The courthouse was designed by the Queensland Chief Architect AB Leven in the Georgian revival style.

The building underwent a major refurbishment in 2003. Four new courtrooms, judicial chambers, jury facilities, interview rooms, vulnerable witness room, public waiting areas and a lift were added.

References

Courthouses in Queensland
Buildings and structures in Mackay, Queensland
Government buildings completed in 1939